Quantico station is a train station in Quantico, Virginia, served by two Amtrak trains and the Virginia Railway Express's Fredericksburg Line. The existing station house was originally built by the Richmond, Fredericksburg and Potomac Railroad in 1953. It is located at 550 Railroad Avenue at Potomac Avenue and is surrounded by the Quantico Marine Base.

History
In 1872, Quantico was the original northern terminus for the Richmond, Fredericksburg and Potomac Railroad. The station also included a freight station on the opposite side of the tracks. Acquisition of the Washington Southern Railway helped expand the line into Washington, D.C. In 1919, a two-story railroad station was built to replace the original station, but as the USMC base began to encroach on the area, RF&P was ordered to rebuild the station in 1953 in order to conform to similar design standards of the base. RF&P ceased passenger operations in 1971 and the station has been used by Amtrak ever since then. The Virginia Railway Express established the Fredericksburg Line in 1992, and Quantico became one of the stations used along the line.

In 2021 construction began on the new platforms as well as a 3rd track. Construction is scheduled to be completed by end of 2023.

References

External links

VRE - Quantico Train Station
Quantico Amtrak-VRE Station (USA Rail Guide -- Train Web)

Transportation in Prince William County, Virginia
Amtrak stations in Virginia
Virginia Railway Express stations
Quantico
Railway stations in the United States opened in 1872
Buildings and structures in Prince William County, Virginia
1872 establishments in Virginia
Quantico, Virginia